USS Patuxent or USNS Patuxent is a name used more than once by the U.S. Navy:

 , sea-going tugboat in commission from 1909 to 1924
 , an oiler in commission from 1942 to 1946
 , a fleet replenishment oiler in service since 1995.

References 

United States Navy ship names